John Keller (born October 5, 1965) is an American former handball player. He competed in the men's tournament at the 1996 Summer Olympics.

References

External links
 

1965 births
Living people
American male handball players
Olympic handball players of the United States
Handball players at the 1996 Summer Olympics
Place of birth missing (living people)
Pan American Games bronze medalists for the United States
Medalists at the 1991 Pan American Games
Pan American Games medalists in handball